Gönül Bridge, also known as Cunda Bridge is a  long solid-arch bridge that crosses the Ayvalık Bay in Ayvalık, Turkey. The bridge connects mainland Anatolia to Lale Island, which in turn connects to Cunda Island via the Ayvalık Strait Bridge.

The bridge replaced a causeway, built in 1964, in order to open up natural water flow into the Aegean Sea. Construction of the bridge started on 6 June 2016 and was expected to be complete by 6 December 2016 at a cost of $2.8 million (₺10 million). However, due to geological problems, the opening was delayed by four months and the cost increased to $4.2 million (₺15 million), with the addition of 277 new bores.

Along with the two lanes for automobile traffic, the bridge will also include lanes for pedestrian and bicycle traffic.

References

Bridges in Turkey
Buildings and structures in Balıkesir Province
Transport infrastructure under construction in Turkey